Patricia Kraus (born 4 January 1964) is a Spanish singer, best known for her participation in the 1987 Eurovision Song Contest.

Early life 
Kraus was born in Milan, Italy. Kraus' father was Alfredo Kraus, a Spanish tenor. As a youngster, Kraus trained as a classical vocalist, but later opted for pop-rock music in preference.

Career 
In 1987, Kraus was chosen internally by TVE as the Spanish representative for that year's Eurovision Song Contest with the song "No estás solo" ("You're Not Alone").  It was not seen by commentators as a Eurovision-friendly song, and at the 1987 Eurovision, held on 9 May in Brussels, could only place 19th out of the 22 entries. The performance is nowadays remembered more for the strange heavy make-up Kraus wore than for the song itself.

Kraus released her first self-titled album shortly after her Eurovision appearance. Further albums followed, including two of experimental electronica in collaboration with Daniel Assante, which were critically well-received although modest sellers. In 1999 she formed the group Waxbeat with Juan Belda and Juan Gómez Acebo, and two albums were released. In 2006, she took part as a singing trainer in the television series  Operación Triunfo, and released a solo album, Alma, in 2007. Kraus, along with Assante and Italian musicians Enrico Barbaro and Gherardo Catanzaro, is currently working under the name of Vintage Club Band.

Albums discography 
1987: Patricia Kraus
1989: De animales y de selva
1991: El eco de tu voz
1996: Batería y voz en dos movimientos (with Daniel Assante)
1998: Atlanterra (with Daniel Assante)
1998: I Amm
2000: Lava's Lamp  (with Waxbeat)
2003: Go Outside and Play (with Waxbeat)
2007: Alma
2009: Vintage Fun Club
2011: Retrocollection
2013: Divazz

References

External links 
 Patricia Kraus website (Spanish)

Spanish women singers
Eurovision Song Contest entrants for Spain
Spanish people of Austrian descent
Eurovision Song Contest entrants of 1987
Singers from Milan
1964 births
Living people